James Starkey was a professional rugby league footballer who played in the 1920s.

Playing career

Club career
James Starkey made his début for Warrington on Saturday 26 March 1921, and he played his last match for Warrington on Saturday 2 April 1921.

References

External links
Search for "Starkey" at rugbyleagueproject.org

English rugby league players
Place of birth missing
Place of death missing
Rugby league centres
Warrington Wolves players
Year of birth missing
Year of death missing